L.A. is an EP by singer-songwriter Teddy Thompson, released in 2001 after his self-titled, debut album. The EP was recorded in November 2001 at Fez, NYC by Ed Haber. "Shine So Bright" and "Sorry to See Me Go" later appeared on Thompson's second full-length album, Separate Ways (2005).

Track listing
 "On My Way"
 "Almost Famous"
 "Shine So Bright"
 "Sorry to See Me Go"
 "L.A."

Personnel
Teddy Thompson – guitar, vocals
Jason Crigler – guitar
Jeff Hill – bass
Bill Dobrow – drums

References

2001 EPs
Teddy Thompson albums